Broad Oak is a village in Sturry parish, Kent, England. It lies west of the A291 road to Herne Bay; the centre of the village is about half a mile northwest of the northern edge of Sturry village.

Mead Manor is 14th century and mentioned in the Domesday Book.

Broad Oak Chapel, built in 1867, is a Chapel of the Countess of Huntingdon's Connexion.

There are two pubs in the village, The Royal Oak and The Golden Lion. However, The Royal Oak has been closed for some time and is currently subject to a planning application for redevelopment of the site.

External links

 Broad Oak Village website

Villages in Kent
City of Canterbury